Maja Storck (born 8 November 1998, Münchenstein) is a Swiss volleyball player. She is a member of the Women's National Team.
She participated at the 2018 Montreux Volley Masters.
She plays for Dresdner SC.

References

External links 
 FIVB Profile
 
 Volleyball – Maja Storck ist „Youngster of the Year“ | Basel Talents
 Maja Storck reacts after Switzerland loses 1-3 against Croatia | #EuroVolleyW 2019
 Day 3: Post-match interview with Switzerland's Maya Storck (swiss german)

1998 births
Living people
Swiss women's volleyball players
Sportspeople from Basel-Landschaft